Syed Shuja’at Ali Qadri (January 1941 – 27 January 1993) was the first Grand Mufti of Pakistan, Judge of Federal Shariat Court, a member of the Pakistani Council of Islamic Ideology, and a scholar of Islamic Sciences and modern science. He was influenced by Mustafa Raza Khan Qadri.

He held various offices and wrote books. He authored books on Islamic fiqh, economics and inheritance, and also translated books from Arabic to Urdu.

Birth and family
Shujaat Ali Qadri was born in Uttar Pradesh, India, in January 1941. He was the son of Syed Masood Ali Qadri, who served in the office of Afta (Islamic jurisprudence) at the Jamia Islamia Anwar-ul-Uloom, a madrasah in Multan, Punjab (Pakistan). Qadri was the second eldest child of his father; his brothers are:
 Syed Saadat Ali Qadri
 Syed Tariq Ali
 Syed Khushnood Ali
 Syed Shafaat Ali

Qadri was the father of three sons and a daughter.

Education
Qadri got his initial education from Madrasa-e-Arabia Hafizia Saadiya, District Dadu, Aligarh. He learned the Quran from Ghulam Rabbani and Shah Ahmad Noorani Siddiqi. He then, at the age of 10, migrated with his parents in 1951 to Multan, Pakistan, and began his education in Madersah Anwar-ul-Ulum and eventually completed his Dars-i Nizami from this institute. He also received Ijaza or authority in the Qadri tariqa of Sufism from Pir Kifayat Ali Shah. He graduated from the Jamia Islamia Anwar-ul-Uloom, Multan, at the age of eighteen. Besides this he achieved the following qualifications:

 M.A Islamiyat, University of Karachi, 1971
 M.A Arabi, University of Karachi, 1974
 Course on Arabic Literature, University of Riyadh, Saudi Arabia, 1984
 PhD, University of Karachi, 1984

Didactic services

Qadri worked as a teacher and mufti in different institutes or madaris of Muslims. He served as the Head of Department and Mufti in Darul Uloom Amjadiya from 1960 to 1973. Thereafter he established Darul Uloom Naeemia. Thereafter, from 1973 till his death, he held the offices of Sheikh ul Hadith and Mufti in Darul Uloom Naeemia, Karachi. Qadri also served as a lecturer in Liaqat Government College, Karachi, for 12 years and as a member of University of Karachi Syndicate for two years.

Ranks and offices held
Besides serving the offices of Sheikh-ul-Hadith and Afta at Darul Ulum Naeemia, for ten years, from 1973 to 1983; he remained as a judge of Federal Shariat Court, Pakistan for six years from 1983 till 1989. He was appointed as Aalim Judge of the Federal Shariat Court on 2 July 1983 and performed his duties till 1 July 1989. He also served as a member of Council of Islamic Ideology, Pakistan and as a member of the Karachi University Syndicate.

Books, texts and translations
His scholarship includes:
 Translation of Tafseere Mazhari (fifteen sections)
 Translation of Mowahib-al-Luduniya
 Translation of Sharah-as-Sadur
 Translation of Al-Khairat-al-Hissan
 Translation of Al-Shifae Sheikh Al-Raees (some parts)
 Insha-al-Arabiya (four parts)
 Translation of Khatme Nabuwat Magazine from Arabic to Urdu
 Magazine on Khatme Nabuwat in Arabi
 Islam mein Murtid ki Saza (Punishment of an apostate in Islam)
 Islam ka Maashi Nizam (Islamic Economic System)
 Aqaid o Aamal (Beliefs and Actions)
 Teen Talaqain (Three divorces)
 Translation and Commentary of Surah Bani Israeel with a biography of the Blessed Prophet Sallalahu Alihay Wassalam
 Fiqahe Ahle Sunnat (Jurisprudence of Ahle Sunnat)
 Adalate Islamia (Islamic Court)
 Man huwa Ahmed Raza? (Who is Ahmed Raza?) – A biography of Aala Hazrat Imam Ahmed Raza Khan, in Arabic Language
 Mujaddid-al-Mata – Some articles on Aala Hazrat Imam Ahmed Raza Khan, in Arabic Language
 Fatawae Rizwiya (Translation of Arabic terms)
 Rasail-e-Aala Hazrat (Collection of booklets written by Aala Hazrat Imam Ahmed Raza Khan with explanatory footnotes, introductions and translation of Arabic and Persion texts)
 Arbaeen
 Composition of the last part of Bahare Shariat (Fiqh Ahle Sunnat, foreword, Madina Publishing, Karachi)
 Phd Thesis – An Academic Movement in Arabic Language-Valley of Sindh in Twelfth-Thirteenth A.D
 Series of articles on the history of Islam, published in the monthly magazine Tarjumaan-e-AhleSunnat (Voice of Ahle Sunnat)

Critical acclaim
Shujaat was a prominent scholar of the Barelvi Movement and was respected by the scholars of major sects of Islam and the people of Pakistan.

Death
On 24 January 1993 Qadri went on an official tour of Indonesia with a delegation of the Ministry of Population Control. It was during this tour that on the fourth Shabaan 1413 Hijri, 27 January 1993 he died of a heart attack in Jakarta. Qadri's funeral procession was led by Hamid Saeed Kazmi, who was at that time the MNA of JUP, in Jakarta. It was estimated that approximately fifty thousand people attended the procession along with the ambassadors and religious scholars from Islamic countries, Indonesian officials, and Pakistan's foreign delegation in Indonesia. His body was brought back to Pakistan on 1 February 1993, by Singapore Airlines, where he was buried in Darul Uloom Naeemia, Karachi. Qadri's funeral procession, in Karachi, was led by his brother, Syed Saadat Ali Qadri, in the presence of a large number of people, journalists, politicians, and scholars from all schools of thought. An estimated crowd of fifteen thousand attended his funeral procession. His tomb is located inside the Daru Uloom Naeemia.

Condolences
Syed Shujaat Ali Qadri's death was termed as a national tragedy and a great loss of an eminent religious scholar of Islam for the people of Pakistan. Former Prime Minister of Pakistan, Muhammad Nawaz Sharif, expressed his shock and grief over Qadri's death in the following manner:
Former Prime Minister of Pakistan and the opposition leader in the National Assembly of Pakistan at that time, Benazir Bhutto, expressed her deep sorrow and grief over his demise:

The then Federal Minister for Religious Affairs, Abdul Sattar Khan Niazi expressed his condolences and said:

Ahmed Noorani Siddiqui visited Qadri's home to offer his condolences to Qadri's family:

See also
 Madrassas in Pakistan
 Ahmad Saeed Kazmi
 Hanafi
 Mufti

References

External links
 Comments by Supporters and Adversaries of Aala Hazrat Imam Ahmad Raza Khan Barelwi
 His praiseworthy comments and appreciation for Aala Hazrat Imam Ahmed Raza Khan Barelwi
 Information on Muftī Justice Sayyid Shujaat 'Alī Qadri's Phd Thesis at the website of Higher Education Commission, Pakistan
 Interview with Mufti Muneebur Rehman

Muhajir people
Pakistani Sunni Muslim scholars of Islam
University of Karachi alumni
1941 births
1993 deaths
Islam in Pakistan
Barelvis